Cuba is an unincorporated community in Graves County, Kentucky, United States.

Cuba was named for the Caribbean island Cuba, which at the time defenders of slavery hoped would be acquired from Spain. Under the influence of tobacco farming and subsequent trade and political interests, the community was named in 1854 during the release of the Ostend Manifesto. The Cuba post office, which had been opened in 1858, closed in 1905.

Notable people

Howie Crittenden, basketball player and coach, school administrator
Bobbie Ann Mason, author

References

Unincorporated communities in Graves County, Kentucky
Unincorporated communities in Kentucky